In the 2011–12 season, MC Saïda is competing in the Ligue 1 for the 5th season, as well as the Algerian Cup. They will be competing in Ligue 1, and the Algerian Cup.

Squad list
Players and squad numbers last updated on 18 November 2011.Note: Flags indicate national team as has been defined under FIFA eligibility rules. Players may hold more than one non-FIFA nationality.

Pre-season and friendlies

Competitions

Overview

{| class="wikitable" style="text-align: center"
|-
!rowspan=2|Competition
!colspan=8|Record
!rowspan=2|Started round
!rowspan=2|Final position / round
!rowspan=2|First match	
!rowspan=2|Last match
|-
!
!
!
!
!
!
!
!
|-
| Ligue 1

|  
| style="background:#FFCCCC;"| 16th
| 10 September 2011
| 19 May 2012
|-
| Algerian Cup

| Round of 64
| Round of 16
| 30 December 2011
| 9 March 2012
|-
! Total

Ligue 1

League table

Results summary

Results by round

Matches

Algerian Cup

Squad information

Playing statistics

|-
! colspan=10 style=background:#dcdcdc; text-align:center| Goalkeepers

|-
! colspan=10 style=background:#dcdcdc; text-align:center| Defenders

|-
! colspan=10 style=background:#dcdcdc; text-align:center| Midfielders

|-
! colspan=10 style=background:#dcdcdc; text-align:center| Forwards

|-
! colspan=10 style=background:#dcdcdc; text-align:center| Players transferred out during the season

Goalscorers

Transfers

In

Out

References

MC Saïda seasons
Algerian football clubs 2011–12 season